Mill Rift Hall is a historic community center located at Millrift in Westfall Township, Pike County, Pennsylvania.  It was built in 1905, and is a one-story, gable roofed wood frame, clapboard sided building on a bluestone foundation.  The interior has an open plan and has an elevated stage and collection of local artifacts.

It was added to the National Register of Historic Places in 1993.

References

Clubhouses on the National Register of Historic Places in Pennsylvania
Buildings and structures completed in 1905
Buildings and structures in Pike County, Pennsylvania
National Register of Historic Places in Pike County, Pennsylvania
1905 establishments in Pennsylvania